Eri Hozumi and Miyu Kato were the defending champions, but Kato chose not to participate this year. Hozumi played alongside Asia Muhammad, but lost in the final to sisters Hsieh Shu-ying and Hsieh Su-wei, 1–6, 6–7(3–7).

Seeds
The top two seeds received a bye into the quarterfinals.

Draw

Draw

References 
 Draw

2017 Doubles
2017 WTA 125K series
2017 in sports in Hawaii